Previously referred to as Columbarium electra, Fulgurofusus electra is a species of large sea snail, marine gastropod mollusk in the family Turbinellidae.

Description

Distribution
First documented in the Straights of Florida, Fulgurofusus electra is found in the waters of the Gulf of Mexico.

References

Turbinellidae
Gastropods described in 1971